Creswell is a small village on the north-western edge of Stafford, the county town of Staffordshire, England situated on elevated ground above the wide floodplain and extensive marshes of the River Sow. Population details taken at the 2011 census can be found under Seighford.

The village, just to the west of the M6 motorway (junction 14), has a population of just a few hundred, although the parish boundary also incorporates the Primepoint business park on the other side of the motorway. The village also lies close to Doxey Marshes.

The name Creswell is thought to come from Old English Cærsewella referring to the plant watercress (cærse in Old English and wella meaning spring or stream), meaning 'the spring where watercress grows.' A Neolithic polished stone axehead was found in a garden in Creswell in 1960, and about a quarter of a mile to the north-west are the ruins of an ancient chapel, or meeting house.

Creswell Chapel

Most of the recorded history of the village centres on 'Creswell Chapel of Ease,' which seems to date from c.1150. The only visible remains of this chapel is a partial ruin standing in fields to the northwest of the village proper. It had been in former times a subsidiary chapel of the Royal Free Chapel of St. Mary in Stafford since 1346. Only the two adjoining north and east walls of the chancel survive, the north window having Early English narrow lancet windows which are typical of the 13th century, while the east wall displays features typical of the 15th century.

Extensive existing earthworks around the chapel ruin suggest other buildings were also present, but the claim that modern archaeological field investigations (have) uncovered no evidence of any buildings other than the chapel in the area...(and) that the antiquarian report mistook the remains of Medieval 'ridge and furrow' farming as the overgrown walls and earthworks of another ruined building,  lacks credibility to anyone making a visit and examining the earthworks present at the site, which by no means resemble the remains of ridge and furrow farming as stated.  Alternatively, the marks could be of much more recent origin. No reference is given as to when the 'modern archaeological investigations' were undertaken or where the report was published.

A 1428 inquisition stated that by ancient custom, the parishioners of Creswell buried their dead in the graveyard of the Church of Saint Bertelin in Stafford, since no burials are recorded at Creswell Chapel.

Wartime air crash
On 4 July 1944 a United States Army Air Forces P-51 Mustang aircraft crashed at Creswell. The pilot, Captain John Pershing Perrin, DFC, age 25, on his first (and last) Mustang flight, was killed when his aircraft, belching smoke and flame, crashed into a Creswell Home Farm wheatfield. Captain Perrin chose to stay with the plane and attempt to land it at the nearest airfield, as he was flying over a populated area.... He was skimming over houses and schools, people - untold others in the town, going about their daily business, kids walking home from school, and this then-pilotless plane, fuel-laden, would be crashing among them.

At the time Captain Perrin was flying the brand new aircraft - one of the first D-variants of the plane to arrive in the UK - from Base Air Depot AAF582 Warton near Preston, Lancashire to AAF122 355th Fighter Wing combat air station Steeple Morden in Cambridgeshire.

Perrin Memorial

On 4 July 2007, the 63rd anniversary of Captain John Pershing Perrin's death, a monolithic stone memorial was erected at the crash site to commemorate the pilot's supreme act of heroism. A joint Anglo-American dedication service was held that day with representatives of the Perrin family, the U.S. Air Force, the Assistant Air Attaché from the American Embassy, Creswell Parish Council, Vice Lord Lieutenant of Staffordshire and Mayor of Stafford in attendance. A bugler from the U.S. Air Forces in Europe Band performed Taps and other musical arrangements were performed by RAF Cosford Voluntary Band. The ceremony concluded with a flypast and aerobatic display by a lone 1944 vintage P-51D Mustang.

See also
Listed buildings in Creswell, Staffordshire

References

External links

Borough of Stafford
Villages in Staffordshire